Since the inception of the English association football league competition, the EFL Championship, in 2004, more than 60 players have scored three goals (a hat-trick) or more in a single match.  The first player to achieve the feat was Englishman Marcus Stewart, who scored three times for Sunderland in a 4–0 victory at Gillingham on 11 September 2004. Brian Deane, Chris Iwelumo, Michael Chopra, Garath McCleary and Nikola Žigić have each scored four goals in a match. The fixture between Norwich City and Scunthorpe United at Carrow Road in 2011 saw both Grant Holt and Simeon Jackson score a hat-trick for the home team.

Dwight Gayle has scored a hat-trick on five occasions in the Football League Championship. He and Chris Iwelumo scored a hat-trick for three clubs.

The list includes only hat-tricks scored in the league; hat-tricks scored in play-off matches are not counted.

Lee Hughes scored back to back hat tricks but is not listed below.

Hat-tricks

Note: The results column shows the home team score first

Multiple hat-tricks
The following table lists players who have scored two or more hat-tricks.

See also 
 List of Premier League hat-tricks
 List of EFL League One hat-tricks
 List of EFL League Two hat-tricks

References 

Hat-tricks
Championship